Candy Ford is an American comedian and television actress, best known for starring in the sketch comedy, The Rerun Show, Ford has also appeared in other TV programs including: Curb Your Enthusiasm, Will & Grace, and she provided voicework for the video games Law & Order and True Crime: New York City, and starred on the short-lived NBC sketch comedy, The Rerun Show and voiced Trixie in the film The Country Bears and later starred in Girls Behaving Badly.

Impressions

Sweet Brown
Mary J. Blige
Mary McLeod Bethune
Bill Cosby
Gary Coleman (as Arnold Jackson in Diff'rent Strokes)
Richard Pryor
Phylicia Rashad
Roxie Roker (as Helen Willis in The Jeffersons)
Danielle Spencer  (as Dee Thomas in What's Happening!!)

References

External links 
 

Living people
American television actresses
20th-century American actresses
21st-century American actresses
Year of birth missing (living people)